Ruth Lyons may refer to:

Ruth Lyons (broadcaster) (1905–1988), radio and television broadcaster in Cincinnati, Ohio
Ruth Lyons (EastEnders), a fictional character in British soap opera EastEnders